Thomas Jefferson Middle School may refer to:

Thomas Jefferson Middle School (Vancouver, Washington), a public middle school in Vancouver, Washington
Middle Schools of Arlington County, Virginia, located at 2700 South Lang Street, Arlington, Virginia
 Thomas Jefferson Middle School (Indio), a public middle school for grades 6 - 8
 Thomas Jefferson Middle School (Miami, FL)

See also
 Jefferson Middle School (disambiguation)